Events from the year 1654 in Ireland.

Incumbent
Lord Protector: Oliver Cromwell

Events
December 24 – William Petty contracts to undertake an accurate survey of Ireland (the "Down Survey").
English Parliamentarian supporters take control of Galway Corporation, dismissing the previous urban elite as "the Tribes of Galway".
The Fraternity of Physicians of Trinity Hall, predecessor of the Royal College of Physicians of Ireland, is established in Dublin by Prof. John Stearne.
William Edmondson establishes what is probably the first Quaker Meeting in Ireland at his house in Lurgan.
Rathmacknee Castle and lands were confiscated after Thomas Rosseter fought against Oliver Cromwell at Wexford in the Irish Confederate Wars.

Births
May 28 – Thomas Handcock, politician (d.1726)
August 4 – Thomas Brodrick, politician (d.1730)
September 11 – William Handcock, lawyer and politician (d.1701)
Sir Henry Bingham, 3rd Baronet, lawyer and politician (d.1714)
Thomas Bligh, politician (d.1710)

Deaths
May 5 – Thomas Walsh, Roman Catholic Archbishop of Cashel, in exile.
May 12 – William Tirry, martyred Roman Catholic priest, executed (b.1609)

References

 
1650s in Ireland
Ireland
Years of the 17th century in Ireland